Catfish (or catfishes; order Siluriformes  or Nematognathi) are a diverse group of ray-finned fish. Named for their prominent barbels, which resemble a cat's whiskers, catfish range in size and behavior from the three largest species alive, the Mekong giant catfish from Southeast Asia, the wels catfish of Eurasia, and the piraíba of South America, to detritivores (species that eat dead material on the bottom), and even to a tiny parasitic species commonly called the candiru, Vandellia cirrhosa. Neither the armour-plated types nor the naked types have scales. Despite their name, not all catfish have prominent barbels or "whiskers". Members of the Siluriformes order are defined by features of the skull and swimbladder. Catfish are of considerable commercial importance; many of the larger species are farmed or fished for food. Many of the smaller species, particularly the genus Corydoras, are important in the aquarium hobby.  Many catfish are nocturnal, but others (many Auchenipteridae) are crepuscular or diurnal (most Loricariidae or Callichthyidae, for example).

Ecology

Distribution and habitat
Extant catfish species live inland or in coastal waters of every continent except Antarctica. Catfish have inhabited all continents at one time or another. They are most diverse in tropical South America, Asia, and Africa, with one family native to North America and one family in Europe. More than half of all catfish species live in the Americas. They are the only ostariophysans that have entered freshwater habitats in Madagascar, Australia, and New Guinea.

They are found in fresh water environments, though most inhabit shallow, running water. Representatives of at least eight families are hypogean (live underground) with three families that are also troglobitic (inhabiting caves). One such species is Phreatobius cisternarum, known to live underground in phreatic habitats. Numerous species from the families Ariidae and Plotosidae, and a few species from among the Aspredinidae and Bagridae, are found in salt water.

In the Southern United States, catfish species may be known by a variety of slang names, such as "mud cat", "polliwogs", or "chuckleheads". These nicknames are not standardized, so one area may call a bullhead catfish by the nickname "chucklehead", while in another state or region, that nickname refers to the blue catfish.

As invasive species

Representatives of the genus Ictalurus have been introduced into European waters in the hope of obtaining a sporting and food resource, but the European stock of American catfishes has not achieved the dimensions of these fish in their native waters, and have only increased the ecological pressure on native European fauna. Walking catfish have also been introduced in the freshwater areas of Florida, with the voracious catfish becoming a major alien pest there. Flathead catfish, Pylodictis olivaris, is also a North American pest on Atlantic slope drainages. Pterygoplichthys species, released by aquarium fishkeepers, have also established feral populations in many warm waters around the world.

Physical characteristics

External anatomy of catfish

Most catfish are bottom feeders. In general, they are negatively buoyant, which means that they usually sink rather than float due to a reduced gas bladder and a heavy, bony head. Catfish have a variety of body shapes, though most have a cylindrical body with a flattened ventrum to allow for benthic feeding.

A flattened head allows for digging through the substrate, as well as perhaps serving as a hydrofoil. Some have a mouth that can expand to a large size and contains no incisiform teeth; catfish generally feed through suction or gulping rather than biting and cutting prey. Some families, though, notably the Loricariidae and Astroblepidae, have a suckermouth that allows them to fasten themselves to objects in fast-moving water. Catfish also have a maxilla reduced to a support for barbels; this means that they are unable to protrude their mouths as other fish such as carp.

Catfish may have up to four pairs of barbels - nasal, maxillary (on each side of mouth), and two pairs of chin barbels, though pairs of barbels may be absent depending on the species. Catfish barbels always occur in pairs. Many larger catfish also have chemoreceptors across their entire bodies, which means they "taste" anything they touch and "smell" any chemicals in the water. "In catfish, gustation plays a primary role in the orientation and location of food". Because their barbels and chemoreception are more important in detecting food, the eyes on catfish are generally small. Like other ostariophysans, they are characterized by the presence of a Weberian apparatus. Their well-developed Weberian apparatus and reduced gas bladder allow for improved hearing and sound production.

Catfish do not have scales; their bodies are often naked. In some species, their mucus-covered skin is used in cutaneous respiration, where the fish breathes through its skin. In some catfish, the skin is covered in bony plates called scutes; some form of body armor appears in various ways within the order. In loricarioids and in the Asian genus Sisor, the armor is primarily made up of one or more rows of free dermal plates. Similar plates are found in large specimens of Lithodoras. These plates may be supported by vertebral processes, as in scoloplacids and in Sisor, but the processes never fuse to the plates or form any external armor. By contrast, in the subfamily Doumeinae (family Amphiliidae) and in hoplomyzontines (Aspredinidae), the armor is formed solely by expanded vertebral processes that form plates. Finally, the lateral armor of doradids, Sisor, and hoplomyzontines consists of hypertrophied lateral line ossicles with dorsal and ventral lamina.

All catfish other than members of the Malapteruridae (electric catfish), possess a strong, hollow, bony, leading spine-like ray on their dorsal and pectoral fins. As a defense, these spines may be locked into place so that they stick outwards, enabling them to inflict severe wounds. In numerous catfish species, these fin rays can be used to deliver a stinging protein if the fish is irritated; as many as half of all catfish species may be venomous in this fashion, making the Siluriformes overwhelmingly the vertebrate order with the largest number of venomous species. This venom is produced by glandular cells in the epidermal tissue covering the spines. In members of the family Plotosidae and of the genus Heteropneustes, this protein is so strong it may hospitalize humans who receive a sting; in Plotosus lineatus, the stings can be lethal. The dorsal- and pectoral-fin spines are two of the most conspicuous features of siluriforms, and differ from those in other fish groups. Despite the widespread use of the spines for taxonomic and phylogenetic studies the fields have struggled to effectively use the information due to a lack of consistency in the nomenclature, with a general standard for the descriptive anatomy of catfish spines proposed in 2022 to try and resolve this problem.

Juvenile catfish, like most fish, have relatively large heads, eyes, and posterior median fins in comparison to larger, more mature individuals. These juveniles can be readily placed in their families, particularly those with highly derived fin or body shapes; in some cases, identification of the genus is possible. As far as known for most catfish, features that are often characteristic of species, such as mouth and fin positions, fin shapes, and barbel lengths, show little difference between juveniles and adults. For many species, pigmentation pattern is also similar in juveniles and adults. Thus, juvenile catfish generally resemble and develop smoothly into their adult form without distinct juvenile specializations. Exceptions to this are the ariid catfish, where the young retain yolk sacs late into juvenile stages, and many pimelodids, which may have elongated barbels and fin filaments or coloration patterns.

Sexual dimorphism is reported in about half of all families of catfish. The modification of the anal fin into an intromittent organ (in internal fertilizers) as well as accessory structures of the reproductive apparatus (in both internal and external fertilizers) have been described in species belonging to 11 different families.

Size

Catfish have one of the greatest ranges in size within a single order of bony fish. Many catfish have a maximum length of under . Some of the smallest species of the Aspredinidae and Trichomycteridae reach sexual maturity at only .

The wels catfish, Silurus glanis, and the much smaller related Aristotle's catfish, are the only catfish indigenous to Europe; the former ranges throughout Europe, and the latter is restricted to Greece. Mythology and literature record wels catfish of astounding proportions, yet are to be proven scientifically. In July 2009, a catfish weighing  was caught in the River Ebro, Spain, by an 11-year-old British schoolgirl.

The largest flathead catfish, Pylodictis olivaris, ever caught was in Independence, Kansas, weighing .

This is the largest giant Mekong catfish caught since Thai officials started keeping records in 1981. Also in Asia, Jeremy Wade caught a  goonch following three fatal attacks on humans in the Kali River on the India-Nepal border. Wade was of the opinion that the offending fish must have been significantly larger than this to have taken an 18-year-old boy, as well as a water buffalo.

Piraíba (Brachyplatystoma filamentosum) can grow exceptionally large and are native to the Amazon Basin. They can occasionally grow to 200 kg (440 lb), as evidenced by numerous catches. Deaths from being swallowed by these fish have been reported in the region.

Internal anatomy

In many catfish, the "humeral process" is a bony process extending backward from the pectoral girdle immediately above the base of the pectoral fin. It lies beneath the skin, where its outline may be determined by dissecting the skin or probing with a needle.

The retinae of catfish are composed of single cones and large rods. Many catfish have a tapetum lucidum, which may help enhance photon capture and increase low-light sensitivity. Double cones, though present in most teleosts, are absent from catfish.

The anatomical organization of the testis in catfish is variable among the families of catfish, but the majority of them present fringed testis: Ictaluridae, Claridae, Auchenipteridae, Doradidae, Pimelodidae, and Pseudopimelodidae. In the testes of some species of Siluriformes, organs and structures such as a spermatogenic cranial region and a secretory caudal region are observed, in addition to the presence of seminal vesicles in the caudal region. The total number of fringes and their length are different in the caudal and cranial portions between species. Fringes of the caudal region may present tubules, in which the lumen is filled by secretion and spermatozoa. Spermatocysts are formed from cytoplasmic extensions of Sertoli cells; the release of spermatozoa is allowed by breaking of the cyst walls.

The occurrence of seminal vesicles, in spite of their interspecific variability in size, gross morphology, and function, has not been related to the mode of fertilization. They are typically paired, multichambered, and connected with the sperm duct, and have been reported to play glandular and storage functions. Seminal vesicle secretion may include steroids and steroid glucuronides, with hormonal and pheromonal functions, but it appears to be primarily constituted of mucoproteins, acid mucopolysaccharides, and phospholipids.

Fish ovaries may be of two types - gymnovarian or cystovarian. In the first type, the oocytes are released directly into the coelomic cavity and then eliminated. In the second type, the oocytes are conveyed to the exterior through the oviduct. Many catfish are cystovarian in type, including Pseudoplatystoma corruscans, P. fasciatum, Lophiosilurus alexandri, and Loricaria lentiginosa.

Communication 
Catfish can produce different types of sounds and also have well-developed auditory reception used to discriminate between sounds with different pitches and velocities. They are also able to determine the distance of the sound's origin and from what direction it originated. This is a very important fish communication mechanism, especially during agonistic and distress behaviors. Catfish are able to produce a variety of sounds for communication that can be classified into two groups: drumming sounds and stridulation sounds.  The variability in catfish sound signals differs due to a few factors: the mechanism by which the sound is produced, the function of the resulting sound, and physiological differences such as size, sex, and age. To create a drumming sound, catfish use an indirect vibration mechanism using a swimbladder. In these fishes, sonic muscles insert on the ramus Mulleri, also known as the elastic spring. The sonic muscles pull the elastic spring forward and extend the swimbladder. When the muscles relax, the tension in the spring quickly returns the swimbladder to its original position, which produces the sound.

Catfish also have a sound-generating mechanism in their pectoral fins. Many species in the catfish family possess an enhanced first pectoral fin ray, called the spine, which can be moved by large abductor and adductor muscles. The base of the catfishes' spines has a sequence of ridges, and the spine normally slides within a groove on the fish's pelvic girdle during routine movement; but, pressing the ridges on the spine against the pelvic girdle groove creates a series of short pulses. The movement is analogous to a finger moving down the teeth of a comb, and consequently a series of sharp taps is produced.

Sound-generating mechanisms are often different between the sexes. In some catfish, pectoral fins are longer in males than in females of similar length, and differences in the characteristic of the sounds produced were also observed. Comparison between families of the same order of catfish demonstrated family and species-specific patterns of vocalization, according to a study by Maria Clara Amorim. During courtship behavior in three species of Corydoras catfish, all males actively produced stridulation sounds before egg fertilization, and the species' songs were different in pulse number and sound duration.

Sound production in catfish may also be correlated with fighting and alarm calls. According to a study by Kaatz, sounds for disturbance (e.g. alarm) and agonistic behavior were not significantly different, which suggests distress sounds can be used to sample variation in agonistic sound production. However, in a comparison of a few different species of tropical catfish, some fish put under distress conditions produced a higher intensity of stridulatory sounds than drumming sounds. Differences in the proportion of drumming versus stridulation sounds depend on morphological constraints, such as different sizes of drumming muscles and pectoral spines. Due to these constraints, some fish may not even be able to produce a specific sound. In several different species of catfish, aggressive sound production occurs during cover site defense or during threats from other fish. More specifically, in long-whiskered catfish, drumming sounds are used as a threatening signal and stridulations are used as a defense signal. Kaatz investigated 83 species from 14 families of catfish, and determined that catfish produce more stridulatory sounds in disturbance situations and more swimbladder sounds in intraspecific conflicts.

Economic importance

Aquaculture

Catfish are easy to farm in warm climates, leading to inexpensive and safe food at local grocers. About 60% of U.S. farm-raised catfish are grown within a 65-mile (100-km) radius of Belzoni, Mississippi. Channel catfish (Ictalurus punctatus) supports a $450 million/yr aquaculture industry. The largest producers are located in the Southern United States, including Mississippi, Alabama, and Arkansas.

Catfish raised in inland tanks or channels are usually considered safe for the environment, since their waste and disease should be contained and not spread to the wild.

In Asia, many catfish species are important as food. Several airbreathing catfish (Clariidae) and shark catfish (Pangasiidae) species are heavily cultured in Africa and Asia. Exports of one particular shark catfish species from Vietnam, Pangasius bocourti, have met with pressures from the U.S. catfish industry. In 2003, The United States Congress passed a law preventing the imported fish from being labeled as catfish. As a result, the Vietnamese exporters of this fish now label their products sold in the U.S. as "basa fish." Trader Joe's has labeled frozen fillets of Vietnamese Pangasius hypophthalmus as "striper."

There is a large and growing ornamental fish trade, with hundreds of species of catfish, such as Corydoras and armored suckermouth catfish (often called plecos), being a popular component of many aquaria. Other catfish commonly found in the aquarium trade are banjo catfish, talking catfish, and long-whiskered catfish.

Catfish as food

Catfish have widely been caught and farmed for food for hundreds of years in Africa, Asia, Europe, and North America. Judgments as to the quality and flavor vary, with some food critics considering catfish excellent to eat, while others dismiss them as watery and lacking in flavor. Catfish is high in vitamin D. Farm-raised catfish contains low levels of omega-3 fatty acids and a much higher proportion of omega-6 fatty acids.

In Central Europe, catfish were often viewed as a delicacy to be enjoyed on feast days and holidays. Migrants from Europe and Africa to the United States brought along this tradition, and in the Southern United States, catfish is an extremely popular food.

The most commonly eaten species in the United States are the channel catfish and the blue catfish, both of which are common in the wild and increasingly widely farmed. Farm-raised catfish became such a staple of the U.S. diet that President Ronald Reagan established National Catfish Day on June 25, 1987 to recognize "the value of farm-raised catfish."

Catfish is eaten in a variety of ways.  In Europe, it is often cooked in similar ways to carp, but in the United States it is popularly crumbed with cornmeal and fried.

In Indonesia, catfish is usually served fried or grilled in street stalls called warung and eaten with vegetables, sambal (a spicy relish or sauce), and usually nasi uduk (traditional coconut rice). The dish is called pecel lele or pecak lele. Lele is the Indonesian word for catfish. The same dish can also be called as lele penyet (squashed catfish) if the fish is lightly squashed along with sambal with a stone mortar-and-pestle. The pecel/pecak version presents the fish in a separate plate while the mortar is solely for sambal.

In Malaysia, catfish is called ikan keli and is fried with spices or grilled and eaten with tamarind and Thai chili gravy and is also often eaten with steamed rice.

In Bangladesh and the Indian states of Odisha, West Bengal and Assam, catfish (locally known as magur) is eaten as a favored delicacy during the monsoons. In the Indian state of Kerala, the local catfish, known as thedu or etta in Malayalam, is also popular.

In Hungary, catfish is often cooked in paprika sauce (Harcsapaprikás) typical of Hungarian cuisine. It is traditionally served with pasta smothered with curd cheese (túrós csusza).

In Myanmar (formally Burma), catfish is usually used in mohinga, a traditional noodle fish soup cooked with lemon grass, ginger, garlic, pepper, banana stem, onions, and other local ingredients.

Vietnamese catfish, of the genus Pangasius, cannot be legally marketed as catfish in the United States, and so is referred to as swai or basa. Only fish of the family Ictaluridae may be marketed as catfish in the United States.See Piazza's Seafood World, LLC v. Odom, 448 F. 3d 744 (5th Cir. 2006), citing Kerrilee E. Kobbeman, "Legislative Note, Hook, Line and Sinker: How Congress Swallowed the Domestic Catfish Industry's Narrow Definition of this Ubiquitous Bottomfeeder," 57 ARK. L.REV. 407, 411-18 (2004). In the UK, Vietnamese catfish is sometimes sold as "Vietnamese river cobbler", although more commonly as Basa.

In Nigeria, catfish is often cooked in a variety of stews. It is particularly cooked in a delicacy popularly known as "catfish pepper soup" which is enjoyed throughout the nation.

In Jewish dietary law, known as kashrut, fish must have fins and scales to be kosher. Since catfish lacks scales, they are not kosher.

Dangers to humans

While the vast majority of catfish are harmless to humans, a few species are known to present some risk. Many catfish species have "stings" (actually non-venomous in most cases) embedded behind their fins; thus precautions must be taken when handling them. Stings by the venomous striped eel catfish have killed people in rare cases.

Taxonomy
The catfish are a monophyletic group. This is supported by molecular evidence.

Catfish belong to a superorder called the Ostariophysi, which also includes the Cypriniformes, Characiformes, Gonorynchiformes and Gymnotiformes, a superorder characterized by the Weberian apparatus. Some place Gymnotiformes as a sub-order of Siluriformes, however this is not as widely accepted. Currently, the Siluriformes are said to be the sister group to the Gymnotiformes, though this has been debated due to more recent molecular evidence.  there are about 36 extant catfish families, and about 3,093 extant species have been described. This makes the catfish order the second or third most diverse vertebrate order; in fact, 1 out of every 20 vertebrate species is a catfish.

The taxonomy of catfish is quickly changing. In a 2007 and 2008 paper, Horabagrus, Phreatobius, and Conorhynchos were not classified under any current catfish families. There is disagreement on the family status of certain groups; for example, Nelson (2006) lists Auchenoglanididae and Heteropneustidae as separate families, while the All Catfish Species Inventory (ACSI) includes them under other families. Also, FishBase and the Integrated Taxonomic Information System lists Parakysidae as a separate family, while this group is included under Akysidae by both Nelson (2006) and ACSI. Many sources do not list the recently revised family Anchariidae. The family Horabagridae, including Horabagrus, Pseudeutropius, and Platytropius, is also not shown by some authors but presented by others as a true group. Thus, the actual number of families differs between authors. The species count is in constant flux due to taxonomic work as well as description of new species. On the other hand, our understanding of catfish should increase in the next few years due to work by the ACSI.

Between 2003 and 2005, over 100 species have been named, a rate three times faster than that of the past century. In June 2005, researchers named the newest family of catfish, Lacantuniidae, only the third new family of fish distinguished in the last 70 years (others being the coelacanth in 1938 and the megamouth shark in 1983). The new species in Lacantuniidae, Lacantunia enigmatica, was found in the Lacantun river in the Mexican state of Chiapas.

The higher-level phylogeny of Siluriformes has gone through several recent changes, mainly due to molecular phylogenetic studies. While most studies, both morphological and molecular, agree that catfishes are arranged into three main lineages, the relationship among these lineages has been a contentious point in which morphological and molecular phylogenetic studies, performed for example by Rui Diogo, differ. The three main lineages in Siluriformes are the family Diplomystidae, the denticulate catfish suborder Loricarioidei (which includes the families Nematogenyidae, Trichomycteridae, Callichthyidae, Scoloplacidae, Astroblepidae, and Loricariidae, which is sometimes referred to as the superfamily Loricarioidea), and the suborder Siluroidei, which contains the remaining families of the order. According to morphological data, Diplomystidae is usually considered to be the earliest branching catfish lineage and the sister group to the other two lineages, Loricarioidei and Siluroidei. Molecular evidence usually contrasts with this hypothesis, and shows the suborder Loricarioidei as the earliest branching catfish lineage, and sister to a clade that includes the Diplomystidae and Siluroidei. While in the first study this relationship was proposed the "morphological" hypothesis could not be rejected, the new, "molecular" phylogenetic hypothesis was later obtained in numerous other phylogenetic studies based on genetic data. However, a recent study based on molecular data argued that the previous "molecular" hypothesis is the result of phylogenetic artifacts due to a strong heterogeneity in evolutionary rates among siluriform lineages. In that study it was suggested that the fast evolution of the Loricarioidei suborder was attracting this clade to the outgroups through long branch attraction, incorrectly placing it as the earliest-branching catfish lineage. When a data filtering method was used to reduce lineage rate heterogeneity (the potential source of bias) on their dataset, a final phylogeny was recovered which showed the Diplomystidae are the earliest-branching catfish, followed by Loricarioidei and Siluroidei as sister lineages. Thus, there is currently both morphological and molecular evidence for a higher-level phylogenetic arrangement of Siluriformes in which Diplomystidae is the earliest branching catfish, sister to a clade including the Loricarioidei and Siluroidei''' suborders.

Below is a list of family relationships by different authors. Lacantuniidae is included in the Sullivan scheme based on recent evidence that places it sister to Claroteidae.

Phylogeny
Phylogeny of living Siluriformes based on 2017 and extinct families based on Nelson, Grande & Wilson 2016.

Unassigned families:
 Scoloplacidae (Loricarioidei)
 Akysidae (Sisoroidea)
 Amblycipitidae (Sisoroidea)
 Anchariidae (Arioidea)
 Ariidae (Arioidea)
 Amphiliidae (Big African catfishes)
 Austroglanididae (Arioidea)
 Chacidae (Siluroidei)
 Conorhynchos (Pimelodoidea)
 Cranoglanididae (Ictaluroidea)
 Heteropneustidae (Clarioidea)
 Horabagridae (Sisoroidea)
 Kryptoglanidae (Siluroidea)
 Lacantuniidae (Big African catfishes)
 Malapteruridae (Big African catfishes)
 Phreatobiidae (Pimelodoidea)
 Rita (Sisoroidea)
 Schilbeidae (Big African catfishes)

Timeline

Catfish fishing records
By information from International Game Fish Association IGFA the most outstanding record:

 The biggest flathead catfish caught was by Ken Paulie in the Elk City Reservoir in Kansas, USA on 19 May 1998 that weighed 55.79 kg (123 lbs. 0 oz.)

References

External links

 All catfish species inventory
 "Giant Baghair caught in Jamuna" in The Daily Star'' (Bangladesh), 12 May 2009
 Skelton, Paul H. and Teugels, Guy G. 1992. Ichthyological Bulletin; No. 56: Neotype description for the African catfish Clarias Gariepinus (Burchell, 1822) (Pisces: Siluroidei: Clariidae). J.L.B. Smith Institute of Ichthyology, Rhodes University, Grahamstown, South Africa

.
Edible fish
Commercial fish
Ostariophysi
Late Cretaceous fish
Extant Late Cretaceous first appearances
Taxa named by Georges Cuvier